Saint Anthony of Padua is a 1580 oil on canvas painting by El Greco, now in the Museo del Prado in Madrid.

It shows Anthony of Padua with his standard attributes of a lily, an open book and an image of the Christ Child. The cloudy background shows the heavy influence of Michelangelo on the young artist, whilst the fast brushstrokes show that of Titian and Tintoretto. On the edge of the book is the artist's signature "IN MANO DI DOMENICO" in maiuscule Greek characters.

Bibliography 
  ÁLVAREZ LOPERA, José, El Greco, Madrid, Arlanza, 2005, Biblioteca «Descubrir el Arte», (colección «Grandes maestros»). .
  SCHOLZ-HÄNSEL, Michael, El Greco, Colonia, Taschen, 2003. .

References

External links 
 

Paintings by El Greco in the Museo del Prado
1580 paintings